was a Japanese actress.

Career
Natsukawa was born in Tokyo and first appeared on stage at age seven. She joined the Nikkatsu studio in 1927 and came to fame through such films as Kantsubaki and Kenji Mizoguchi's Tokyo March. She married the song composer Nobuo Iida and retired from acting for a while, but returned to the screen with Shiro Toyoda's Kojima no haru. She played many secondary roles on film and television after the war.

Both her brother Daijirō Natsukawa and her daughter Kahoru Natsukawa took up acting.

Selected filmography

Film
The Glow of Life (1918)
Tokyo March (1929)
Young People (1937)
Spring on Leper's Island (1940)
Love Letter (1953)
Be Happy, These Two Lovers (1953)
Twenty-Four Eyes (1954)
Shuzenji Monagatari (1955), Hōjō Masako
Anzukko (1958)

Television
 Akō Rōshi (1964)

References

External links
 
 

1909 births
People from Tokyo
1999 deaths
Japanese stage actresses
Japanese silent film actresses
20th-century Japanese actresses
Japanese television actresses
Recipients of the Medal with Purple Ribbon